The Winnipeg Statement is the Canadian Conference of Catholic Bishops' statement on the papal encyclical Humanae vitae from a plenary assembly held at Saint Boniface in Winnipeg, Manitoba. Published on September 27, 1968, it is the Canadian bishops' document about rejecting Pope Paul VI's July 1968 encyclical on human life and the regulation of birth.

Summary
Published two months after Humanae vitae, the Winnipeg Statement was an attempt by the Canadian Conference of Catholic Bishops to address widespread concern within the church about the prohibition of all forms of artificial contraception, and to counsel its members on how to respond to those who have difficulty accepting the directives.

It recognized that "a certain number of Catholics", in spite of being bound by the encyclical, find it "either extremely difficult or even impossible to make their own all elements of this doctrine". These

With regard to those in that situation, "the confessor or counsellor must show sympathetic understanding and reverence for the sincere good faith of those who fail in their effort to accept some point of the encyclical."

Paragraph 26 stated:

In its conclusion, the document referred to the moment of the publication of the encyclical as an "hour of crisis", but added:

Reception
Although many episcopal conferences published statements regarding Humanae vitae, it is the Canadian bishops' statement which has been the subject of the most controversy, as has been widely interpreted as a loophole whereby Catholics may feel permitted to use birth control. Central to the debate is the role and importance of personal religious freedom of conscience.

Support
Some see the statement as an honest pastoral attempt to maintain unity of the Church in Canada. As Bishop Alexander Carter (then President of the Canadian Conference of Catholic Bishops) explained,

Supporters contend that the Canadian bishops were merely trying to defend those who had not matured sufficiently in their faith, and that they were simply upholding the established doctrine expressed in Dignitatis humanae, the Vatican II Declaration on Religious Freedom. They argue that it was this document which compelled the bishops "to support the need for personal freedom when dealing with the Church's rejection of artificial contraception ... [and to insist] that married couples could only form their consciences in an atmosphere free of coercion."

Some have claimed that the statement was accepted "with satisfaction" by Pope Paul VI. Although this allegation is strongly disputed, it is worth noting that the Holy See has not published an official condemnation of the Winnipeg Statement, per se.

Opposition
The statement was met with immediate and vocal opposition, which found root especially among conservative practicing Catholic anti-abortion activists. The objections of opponents to the statement are perhaps best summarized in the writings of Vincent Foy, who contends, among other things, that the Winnipeg Statement:

is tantamount to blasphemy, has increased dissent in the church, and is an act of disobedience to the Holy See
has fostered support for homosexuality, the ordination of women, the "fundamental option", and abortion
is a major factor in the crisis of vocations to the priesthood and religious life
has facilitated anti-life and immoral government legislation
has deprived spouses of married love, has pitted spouses against one another, has made faithful Catholic couples feel betrayed and unsupported, and has been the cause of many marital breakups
permits extra-marital sex, and has led to a lowered respect for women
has not only adversely affected married life in Canada but in many other countries
has led to the killing of countless persons through abortifacient pills and devices

Foy further alleges that Cardinal Gerald Emmett Carter, one of the authors, partially repudiated the wording of the most controversial paragraph of the statement, writing in a private letter that "I am not prepared to defend paragraph 26 totally. In a sense, the phraseology was misleading and could give the impression that the bishops were saying that one was free to dissent at will from the Pope's teaching".

Reiteration in 1969
In view of calls for the Canadian bishops to officially retract the Winnipeg Statement, they issued a year later a statement in which they declared: "Nothing could be gained and much lost by an attempt to rephrase what we have said in Winnipeg. We stand squarely behind our position but we feel it is our duty to insist on a proper interpretation of that position." They added:

In 1998, the Canadian bishops voted by secret ballot on a resolution to retract the Winnipeg Statement. It did not pass.

Calls for retraction continue, though some see the Canadian bishops' December 1, 1973, document, Statement on the Formation of Conscience, as evidence that they were trying to distance themselves from the Winnipeg Statement.

In 2008, the Canadian bishops issued a pastoral letter titled "Liberating Potential" that was unquestioned as being in full conformity with Humanae vitae, and invited all to "discover or rediscover" its message. Critics of the Winnipeg Statement saw the new document as counterbalancing what it called the "heretical" earlier statement.

Also in 2008, Canadian bishops unanimously stated that they were opposed to the appointment of the abortion provider and pro-choice advocate Henry Morgentaler to the Order of Canada, directly quoting from the Compendium of Social Doctrine. Moreover, the bishops generally advocate pro-life views through the Catholic Organization for Life and Family, the official episcopal agency dedicated to life issues.

See also

Christian views on birth control

References

External links
Canadian Bishops' Statement on the Encyclical "Humanae vitae" (the text of the Winnipeg Statement)
Humanae vitae: Encyclical of Pope Paul VI on the Regulation of Birth

Supporters
Freedom and Responsibility, by Neil MacDonald

Opponents
Fifty Reasons Why The Winnipeg Statement Should be Recalled, by Vincent Foy
The Rosarium of the Blessed Virgin Mary (website dedicated to retracting The Winnipeg Statement and exposing the consequences of contraception)
Vehement denunciation of the Winnipeg Statement by John Corapi (video)

History of Winnipeg
Catholicism-related controversies
Catholic theology of the body
Catholic Church in Canada
Political statements
1968 in Canada
1968 in Christianity
20th-century Catholicism
Modernism in the Catholic Church
1968 documents